Grammitis nudicarpa is a fern in the family Polypodiaceae.

Description
The plant is a very small epiphytic fern. It has a short rhizome with dark brown, pointed scales. Its simple fronds combine a short stipe with a narrowly oblanceolate lamina 2–8 cm long and 0.3–0.8 cm wide.

Distribution and habitat
The fern is endemic to Australia’s subtropical Lord Howe Island in the Tasman Sea; it is confined to the densely shaded summit areas of Mounts Lidgbird and Gower.

References

nudicarpa
Epiphytes
Endemic flora of Lord Howe Island
Plants described in 1942
Ferns of Australia
Taxa named by Edwin Copeland